Prometheus Unbound may refer to:

 Prometheus Unbound (Aeschylus), a play by Aeschylus
 Prometheus Unbound (Shelley), a play by Shelley
 "Prometheus Unbound" (Stargate SG-1), episode of the television show Stargate SG-1
 Prometheus Unbound, the second book of the manga Appleseed
 "Prometheus Unbound", the third episode of the second season of Beast Machines
 Prometheus Unbound, a work for chorus and orchestra by Havergal Brian

See also
 "Prometheus Unbound", a poem by Filipino poet Pete Lacaba
 The Unbound Prometheus, an economic history book by David Landes